Jonny Greenwood is an English musician and composer. As a member of the rock band Radiohead, he has received several awards and nominations, including three Grammy Awards, an MTV Video Music Award and seventeen Brit Award nominations. He was inducted into the Rock and Roll Hall of Fame as a member of Radiohead in March 2019.

Greenwood has also received awards and nominations for his work scoring films by directors including Paul Thomas Anderson, and Lynne Ramsay, Pablo Larraín and Jane Campion. His score for Anderson's There Will Be Blood (2007) earned nominations for the BAFTA Award for Best Original Music and the Grammy Award for Best Score Soundtrack for Visual Media and won the Critics' Choice Movie Award for Best Score. For Anderson's Phantom Thread (2018), Greenwood was nominated for the Academy Award for Best Original Score. For his soundtrack for Ramsay's You Were Never Really Here (2017), he received the British Independent Film Award for Best Music. He was nominated for an Academy Award a second time for his soundtrack to The Power of the Dog (2021).

Academy Awards
The Academy Awards are given by the Academy of Motion Picture Arts and Sciences annually for excellence of cinematic achievements.

British Academy Film Awards
The British Academy Film Award is an annual award show presented by the British Academy of Film and Television Arts.

British Independent Film Awards
The British Independent Film Awards are presented annually to recognize the best in British independent cinema.

Critics' Choice Movie Awards
The Critics' Choice Movie Awards are presented annually since 1995 by the Broadcast Film Critics Association for outstanding achievements in the cinema industry.

Golden Globe Awards
The Golden Globe Award is an accolade bestowed by the 93 members of the Hollywood Foreign Press Association (HFPA) recognizing excellence in film and television, both domestic and foreign.

Grammy Awards
The Grammy Award is an annual award show presented by The Recording Academy.

Hollywood Music in Media Awards
The Hollywood Music in Media Awards (HMMA) in an organization that honours the best in original music for media.

Ivor Novello Awards
The Ivor Novello Awards are given by the Ivors Academy to recognize the best in songwriting and composing.

Satellite Awards
The Satellite Awards are a set of annual awards given by the International Press Academy.

Various awards and nominations

Critics associations

See also

References

External links 
 

Greenwood, Jonny